Bamakhrama (بامخرمه): is a tribe from Hadhramaut state in the Republic of Yemen. This family is one of the tribes which constitute the "Hemiyar" (حمير) tribe. Hemiyar is one of the largest tribes in the Arabian Peninsula. Bamakhrama is famous for its scientists, judges, and scholars. For thousands of years Bamakhrama was responsible for the "justice" affairs between Hemiyar tribes.

Here are some of the most famous scholars and eminent men from Bamakhrama:

- Ahmed bin Abdullah bin Ahmed Bamakhrama (أحمد بن عبدالله بن أحمد بامخرمه): Born in Aden in 1461 AD (866 Hijri). He studied Islamic Fiqh, mathematics and became famous scholar and scientist. He died in 1505 AD (911 Hijri).

- El-Tayeb bin Abdullah bin Ahmed Bamakhrama (الطيب بن عبد الله بن أحمد بامخرمه): Born in Aden in  1465 AD (870 Hijri). He studied Islamic Fiqh, mathematics, Arabic and became the judge of Aden until he died in 1540 AD (947 Hijri).

- Abdullah bin Ahmed bin Ali Bamakhrama (عبدالله بن أحمد بن علي بامخرمه): born in Hajrin, Hadhramaut in 1429 AD (833 Hijri) then he moved to Aden for study. He studied Islamic fiqh, mathematics, engineering, Arabic, Tafseer, and Arabic grammar. After that He became the judge of Aden. He wrote books in Islamic fiqh, engineering and mathematics, and Arabic.

- Rifki Abdoulkader Bamakhrama: born in Djibouti on March 3, 1954, Politician and Painter he proved his worth in  various public positions that he held for  years. His professional success is only associated with  simplicity, sincerity and integrity that characterized his life as exemplified by these milestones. In 1977, he was appointed organizer at the Association du Théâtre des Salines. Barely a year later, he moved to the Ministry of Youth, Sports and Culture where he headed the Cultural Facilitation department. In 1983, he created the first Theater Festival in Djibouti on the International Youth Day. In 1985, he became deputy director of the Palais du Peuple, during which mandate he also performed  parts in numerous plays, including “L’os de Mor Lam”, written in 1960 by Birago Diop, “L’Herbe verte”, and “Le pêcheur de la Mer rouge”. During this same year, he co-founded the Association Culturelle Moussa Ali. In 1988, he created the first dance festival in Djibouti. In 1999, and after he had already served at the head of the Ministry of Youth, Sports and Culture, he was appointed Minister of Communication, in charge of Culture. In this same year, he created the Fest'Horn, a festival that is now in its 14th edition this year. During all these years and through all his administrative and artistic responsibilities, he never stopped drawing.

It is therefore not surprising  that such a vivid figure would leave politics for the sake of art. This decision is the natural outcome of the passion that Bamakhrama's has nurtured for art since he was at school. A passion that fuelled his numerous contributions to the improvement of the social condition of the Djiboutian artist. A passion that runs deep in his veins for having inherited it from his father, late Abdoulkader Bamakhrama, an international musician and composer who left a rich and valuable poetic and musical legacy that the son, artist Rifki Bamakhrama strives to further enrich. Thanks to  his perseverance, his atypical, sometimes figurative and sometimes impressionistic and abstract, but always lyrical art, the son became a pillar of Djiboutian art's.

Ethnic groups in Yemen